Ibrahima Breze Fofana (born 15 August 2002) is a Guinean footballer who plays as a central midfielder for Hammarby IF in Allsvenskan.

Early life
Born and raised in Conakry, Guinea, Fofana played youth football with local clubs FC Atouga and Diamants de Guinee.

Club career

Club Brugge
On 17 September 2020, following a successful trial, Fofana signed a three-year contract with Club Brugge in the Belgian First Division A. In 2020–21, Fofana made nine appearances for the club's reserve team Club NXT, competing in the second tier First Division B. He was regularly called up to train and play friendlies with the first-team squad, but failed to make any competitive appearances for Club Brugge. In late February 2021, Fofana sat on the bench in both legs against Dynamo Kyiv in the Europa League's round of 16, but remained an unused substitute.

Hammarby IF
On 22 July 2022, Fofana joined Hammarby TFF, the feeder team of Swedish Allsvenskan club Hammarby IF. He moved on a free transfer and signed a six month-deal, with an option for a further year. In 2022, he made 16 league appearances for Hammarby TFF, scoring four goals, helping the side to finish 6th in the Ettan table. On 30 January 2023, Fofana was promoted to Hammarby's senior squad, signing a four-year contract.

Career statistics

Club

References

2002 births
Living people
Guinean footballers
Guinean expatriate footballers
Guinea youth international footballers
Association football midfielders
Challenger Pro League players
Ettan Fotboll players
Club Brugge KV players
Club NXT players
Hammarby Talang FF players
Hammarby Fotboll players
Guinean expatriate sportspeople in Belgium
Expatriate footballers in Belgium
Sportspeople from Conakry